Jean-Baptiste Phạm Minh Mẫn (born 5 March 1934) is a cardinal priest and archbishop emeritus of Ho Chi Minh City in the Roman Catholic Church.

Biography
Born in Cà Mau, Vietnam, Asia, Mẫn studied in Cần Thơ and Saigon, and was ordained a priest on 25 May 1965, serving the diocese of Cần Thơ.

After studying in the United States, Mẫn taught in Vietnam for a number of years. In 1993, he was appointed Coadjutor Bishop of Mỹ Tho and promoted to Archbishop of Hồ Chí Minh City in 1998. He officiated at a mass in La Vang in 1998 for the 200th anniversary of the apparition of the Virgin Mary, the largest Vietnamese Catholic event up to that time.

Mẫn was elevated to cardinal in the consistory of 21 October 2003 by Pope John Paul II, and was one of the cardinal electors who participated in the 2005 papal conclave that selected Pope Benedict XVI.

On 7 March 2013, Mẫn was the last cardinal to arrive to attend the 2013 papal conclave to select the successor to Pope Benedict XVI. The conclave subsequently elected Pope Francis.

On 28 September 2013, Pope Francis appointed Bishop Paul Bùi Văn Đọc, previously (since 1999) serving as Bishop of the Roman Catholic Diocese of Mỹ Tho, Vietnam (one of the Archdiocese of Hồ Chí Minh City's suffragan dioceses), as Coadjutor Archbishop of the Archdiocese.

On 22 March 2014, Pope Francis accepted the resignation of Cardinal Mẫn due to age limit. Coadjutor Archbishop Paul Bùi Văn Đọc succeeded him as Archbishop of Hồ Chí Minh City.

Events

5 Mar 1934: Born in Cà Mau
25 May 1965: Ordained Priest
22 Mar 1993: Appointed	Coadjutor Bishop of Mỹ Tho
11 Aug 1993: Ordained Bishop
1 Mar 1998: Appointed	Archbishop of Hồ Chí Minh City
21 Oct 2003: Appointed	Cardinal-Priest of San Giustino
23 Nov 2003: Installed	Cardinal-Priest of San Giustino
22 Mar 2014: Retired Archbishop of Hồ Chí Minh City

References

External links

 
 Biography at catholic-pages.com
 Biography at GCatholic.org

Catholic Church in Vietnam
1934 births
Living people
Vietnamese cardinals
People from Cà Mau Province
Cardinals created by Pope John Paul II